Capitalism and Schizophrenia is a two-volume theoretical work by the French authors Gilles Deleuze and Félix Guattari, respectively a philosopher and a psychoanalyst. Its volumes are Anti-Oedipus (1972, translated in 1977) and A Thousand Plateaus (1980, translated in 1987). Deleuze's translator Brian Massumi observes that the books differ drastically in tone, content, and composition.

References

Sources
 Deleuze, Gilles and Félix Guattari. 1972. Anti-Œdipus. Trans. Robert Hurley, Mark Seem and Helen R. Lane. London and New York: Continuum, 2004. Vol. 1 of Capitalism and Schizophrenia. 2 vols. 1972–1980. Trans. of L'Anti-Oedipe. Paris: Les Editions de Minuit. .
 ---. 1980. A Thousand Plateaus. Trans. Brian Massumi. London and New York: Continuum, 2004. Vol. 2 of Capitalism and Schizophrenia. 2 vols. 1972–1980. Trans. of Mille Plateaux. Paris: Les Editions de Minuit. .
 Guattari, Félix. 1984. Molecular Revolution: Psychiatry and Politics. Trans. Rosemary Sheed. Harmondsworth: Penguin. . 
 ---. 1995. Chaosophy. Ed. Sylvère Lotringer. Semiotext(e) Foreign Agents Ser. New York: Semiotext(e). .
 ---. 1996. Soft Subversions. Ed. Sylvère Lotringer. Trans. David L. Sweet and Chet Wiener. Semiotext(e) Foreign Agents Ser. New York: Semiotext(e). .
 Massumi, Brian. 1992. A User's Guide to Capitalism and Schizophrenia: Deviations from Deleuze and Guattari. Swerve editions. Cambridge, United States and London: MIT. .

External links
 Reading Notes on Deleuze and Guattari, Capitalism and Schizophrenia by Michael Hardt

1972 non-fiction books
1980 non-fiction books
Anti-fascist books
Works by Gilles Deleuze
Works by Félix Guattari
French non-fiction books
Collaborative non-fiction books